The S20 is a railway service of RER Fribourg that provides hourly service between  and , in the Swiss cantons of Neuchâtel and Freiburg, respectively. Transports publics Fribourgeois operates the service.

Operations 
It uses the western end of the Bern–Neuchâtel line, the entirety of the Fribourg–Ins line, and a portion of the Lausanne–Bern line.

History 
With the December 2021 timetable change, both the S20 and S21 were extended south from Fribourg to Romont, replacing the S40. The S21 began running on weekends with this change, while the S20 operated between Fribourg and Romont on weekdays only.

References

External links 
 2022 timetable: Neuchâtel–Fribourg and Fribourg–Romont

RER Fribourg lines
Transport in the canton of Bern
Transport in the canton of Fribourg
Transport in the canton of Neuchâtel
Transport in the canton of Vaud